Visitors to Sierra Leone must obtain a visa from one of the Sierra Leonean diplomatic missions unless they come from one of the visa exempt countries.

Visa policy map

Visa exemption 
Citizens of the following 14 countries can visit Sierra Leone without a visa:

Non-ordinary passports
A maximum stay of 1 month without a visa is allowed for holders of diplomatic and service passports issued to nationals of Iran and for holders of diplomatic, service and public affairs passports of China.

Visa on arrival 
Citizens of the following countries can obtain a visa on arrival:

Only IATA lists Armenia, Azerbaijan, Belarus, Georgia, Kazakhstan, Kyrgyzstan, Moldova, Tajikistan, Turkmenistan, Ukraine and Uzbekistan as countries whose citizens are eligible for visa on arrival while the official public notice of the Sierra Leone Immigration Service makes no mention of those countries.

eVisa
In March 2019 it was announced that Sierra Leone is going to invest into development of an electronic visa system. As of 2020, it is possible to apply for an eVisa online, for stays of 30 days within a 90 day period.

See also

 Visa requirements for Sierra Leonean citizens

References

Sierra Leone
Foreign relations of Sierra Leone